Holy Rosary Minor Seminary (also named Seminario del Santisimo Rosario) is a Roman Catholic seminary or a house of formation for high school and college would-be priests run by the Archdiocese of Caceres in Naga City, Philippines.

History

Founded on March 7, 1793 by Archbishop Antonio Gallego of Manila, Holy Rosary Minor Seminary started as Casa de Clerigos (House of Clerics) in a place called Padian (now, Caceres St.) near the Bicol River. It was canonically erected as Seminario Conciliar de Nueva Caceres in compliance with the Tridentine Decree that every diocese must have a seminary. In 1840, it was transferred from Padian to its present site along Elias Angeles St. When the seminary building opened in 1793 it was made of wood, bamboo and nipa which a certain bishop noted as "combustible and of non-durable materials". The initial staff was composed of a rector (provisor and vicar general of the diocese); a vice-rector(a Franciscan professor) and two other professors who taught Latin and Humanities. In nine years after its opening, it had 11 deacons, 24 subdeacon and 247 minor seminarians. In 1855, the seminary building was damaged by a strong earthquake and a fire razed it the ground in 1863.
In 1865, Nueva Caceres Bishop Francisco Gainza, O.P. rebuilt and expanded the new seminary building. The Vincentian Fathers (C.M.) took over the management and formation of the seminary in 1865 to become a seminary-college and center of education for lay people in Southern Luzon.
In 1925, Bishop Francisco Reyes renamed it as Seminario del Santissimo Rosario and abolished the College and retained the Conciliar Seminary. It was partly damaged when it was bombed by the Japanese during the second war.

In 1964, it was renamed Holy Rosary Minor Seminary under the new management of Diocese of Clegy. In 1970, a powerful typhoon extensively damaged the Seminary and was rebuilt under the leadership of Archbishop Teopisto Alberto.

It was declared as a National Historical Landmark on June 11, 1978 by then National Historical Institute as a tribute to its having produced martyrs, patriots and heroes like Jose Maria Panganiban, Tomas Arejola and nine of the fifteen Bikol Martyrs namely, Gabriel Prieto, P. Severino Diaz, Leon Hernandez, Mariano Ordinanza, Mariano Arana, Camilo Jacob, Ramon Abella, Domingo Abella and Tomas Prieto. Among its prominent alumni are Bishop Jorgr Barlin, the first Filipino Bishop, Jose Tomas Cardinal Sanchez and 21 other bishops in the country.

On September 5, 1988 the late Archbishop Leonardo Legaspi renamed it back to Holy Rosary Minor Seminary and inaugurated the Museo del Seminario Conciliar de Nueva Caceres which houses altars and statues, books and vestments used by bishops and priests.

Description  

The two-storey brick structure is rectangular in plan with eclectic Italian Renaissance ornamentation. Its composition is symmetrical with a central block and indented right and left wings. Its ground floor facade is a series of brick arches quite similar to Florentine Renaissance architecture. On the roof level is a brick cornice above the frieze composed of triglyphs and regula, elements from classical Greek Architecture. The frieze is supported by a stylized Doric crenelated brick pilaster. The second floor facade has verandahs supported by a projection of brick cornices with ornamental ironwork fern design ledge. The doors are topped by corniced rain-stopper.

On October 17, 2003, the late Archbishop Legaspi opened the Bishop Domingo Collantes Library with a 30,000-book collection and can sit 100 readers in its 280 sq. m. hall.

The seminary offers Junior High School (Grades 7–10) and Senior High School (Grades 11–12) in accordance with the K-12 curriculum. It offers the General Academic Strand for Senior High School which includes Introduction to Philosophy and other courses in Journalism in preparation for the Major Seminary

Administration
Presently the Seminary is under the leadership of the Archbishop of Caceres, the Most Reverend Rolando Tria Tirona O.C.D. D.D. Its rector is Fr. Mario Arnulfo B. Gaite with the assistance of, namely: Fr. Jay Jose L. Jacinto (Director of Human Formation and also functioning as the Vice-Rector), Fr. Jay Aguilar (Director of Spiritual Formation,) Fr. Rolando B. Canonce (Director of Intellectual Formation and also the Vice-Principal), with the newly appointed priests, Fr.

Gallery

References

External links

 Holy Rosary Minor Seminary Official Website
 Holy Rosary Major Seminary Official Website

Buildings and structures in Naga, Camarines Sur
Education in Naga, Camarines Sur
Religion in Camarines Sur